Ahlden is a municipality in Lower Saxony, Germany. Ahlden or Ahldén may also refer to
Ahlden (Samtgemeinde) in Lower Saxony, Germany
Ahlden House in Lower Saxony, Germany
Erik Ahldén (1923–2013), Swedish runner